Shekarau or Shekkarau may refer to the following people.

Shekarau I, a Hausa king (reign: 1290-1307)
Shekarau II, a Hausa king (reign: 1649-1651)
Ibrahim Shekarau, former Nigerian minister of education and Governor of Kano State